Nicholas J. Higham may refer to:

 Nicholas Higham (Nicholas John Higham), professor of mathematics at the University of Manchester (UK)
 N. J. Higham (Nicholas John 'Nick' Higham), professor emeritus of history at the University of Manchester (UK)